Lenti is a surname. Notable people with the surname include:

Emiddio Lenti (1628–1691), Italian Roman Catholic prelate
Eugene Lenti (born 1957), American softball coach 
Filippo Lenti (1633–1684), Italian Roman Catholic prelate
Frank Lenti (born 1947), Canadian outlaw biker and criminal